The Holland Dream is a semi-professional basketball team in the Independent Basketball Association based in Holland, Michigan. The team began as the Holland Blast, and changed its name when the team entered the IBA. The team is owned by Tom Moore. The Dream play at the Holland Civic Center, former home of Hope College, who moved into the new DeVos Fieldhouse. They were members of the International Basketball League from 2005 to 2011.

History
The Holland Blast produced two IBL Hall of Fame players:
 Jared Bledsoe, a 6'2" guard originally from Memphis, averaged a league-best, 43 points per game in the 2006 IBL playoffs and is the Holland Blast all-time leading scorer and assist man. He was twice an All-NSIC selection while playing at Moorhead State University, Bledsoe accepted the women's assistant coach position at Concordia College in 2012.
 Dennis Springs from Toledo, Ohio.  Ranked 3rd in the IBL in scoring at 27.9 points per game and 1st in the IBL in Assists with 10.9 assist per game. The 5'6 guard scored a career IBL high 49 points vs the Grand Rapids flight.   
Both have enjoyed successful careers playing basketball overseas.

Former assistant coach Terry Smith took over as head coach for the 2007 season after Mike Ahrens submitted his resignation.

Coach Smith was Grand Valley State University’s Men's Basketball Coach from 1997-2004 where he won 110 games. Smith has received many professional honors including the 1996 NABC Coach of the Year.

Season by season

IBL All-Stars

2006
 Jared Bledsoe
 James Jackson
 Dennis Springs

2007
 Jared Bledsoe
 Dennis Springs

References

External links
Holland Dream on USbasket.com
@HDream24

Independent Basketball Association teams
Basketball teams in Michigan
Holland, Michigan
Basketball teams established in 2005
2005 establishments in Michigan